is a trans-Neptunian object from the outermost region of the Solar System. It was first observed on 22 October 2014, by astronomers with the Outer Solar System Origins Survey at the Mauna Kea Observatories, Hawaii, and was provisionally designated  . , it has not been numbered.

Orbit and classification 

 orbits the Sun at a distance of 34.7–81.6 AU once every 443 years and 5 months (161,970 days; semi-major axis of 58.15 AU). Its orbit has an eccentricity of 0.40 and an inclination of 9° with respect to the ecliptic. The body's observation arc begins at Mauna Kea on 9 August 2013, more than a year prior to its official discovery observation on 22 October 2014. , the object is about 37.8 AU from the Sun, with an apparent magnitude of 24.44, and will come to perihelion in 2044.

 is a resonant trans-Neptunian object that stays in a rare 3:8 mean-motion orbital resonance with Neptune, orbiting exactly three times the Sun for every 8 orbits Neptune does. Long-term numerical integrations of the object's orbit by the Deep Ecliptic Survey shows a minimum perihelion distance of 34 AU. The classification is deemed secure.

Numbering and naming 

This minor planet has neither been numbered nor named. According to the established naming conventions, it will be given a mythological name associated with the underworld.

Physical characteristics 

, no rotational lightcurve for this object has been obtained from photometric observations. The body's rotation period and pole as well as its albedo and surface composition remain unknown.

References

External links 
 List Of Centaurs and Scattered-Disk Objects, Minor Planet Center
 
 

Minor planet object articles (unnumbered)
Discoveries by OSSOS
20141022